Calathus minutus is a species of ground beetle from the Platyninae subfamily that can be found in Portugal and Spain.

References

minutus
Beetles described in 1866
Beetles of Europe